Kingston may refer to:

Places 
 List of places called Kingston, including the five most populated:

 Kingston, Jamaica
 Kingston upon Hull, England
 City of Kingston, Victoria, Australia
 Kingston, Ontario, Canada
 Kingston upon Thames, England

Animals
 Kingston (horse) (1884–1912), an American Thoroughbred racehorse
 Kingston parakeets, feral parakeets in the UK

Music
 Kingston (band), a New Zealand pop/rock band
 Kingston (country music band), an American duo 
 Kingston Maguire, known as Kingston, of hip hop duo Blue Sky Black Death
 The Kingston Trio, an American folk and pop music group

People
 Kingston (surname), a surname, including a list of people with the name
 Earl of Kingston and Baron Kingston and Viscount Kingston, a title in the Peerage of Ireland
 Duke of Kingston-upon-Hull, a title in the Peerage of Great Britain, and Earl of Kingston-upon-Hull, a title in the Peerage of England

Rivers
 Kingston Brook, a small river in central England
 Kingston Creek, a small river in San Mateo County, California

Other uses
 Kingston (biscuit), an Australian sweet biscuit
 Kingston clan, or The Latter Day Church of Christ, a Mormon fundamentalist denomination
 Kingston Cricket Club, an 18th-century team in Kingston upon Thames, England
 Kingston FC, a soccer team in Ontario, Canada
 Kingston station (Rhode Island), a historic American railway station
 Kingston Technology, an American multinational computer technology corporation 
 Kingston (Upper Marlboro, Maryland), a historic home in the U.S.
 List of ships named Kingston
 HM Prison Kingston, former prison in Portsmouth, England

See also

Kingston Airport (disambiguation)
Kingston Road (disambiguation)
Kingston Bridge (disambiguation)
Kingston College (disambiguation)
Kingston Hill (disambiguation)
Kingston House (disambiguation)
Kingston station (disambiguation)
Kingstone (disambiguation)
Kington (disambiguation)
Kingtown (disambiguation)
Kingstown (disambiguation)
Kinston (disambiguation)
 Kingston courthouse shooting, a 2005 incident in Kingston, Tennessee, U.S.
 Kingston: Confidential, an American TV drama
 Kingston v Preston, an English contract law case
 Kingston valve, fitted in the bottom of a ship